San Uk Tsuen or San Uk Resite Village is a village on Tsing Yi island, in Kwai Tsing District, Hong Kong.

Administration
San Uk is a recognized village under the New Territories Small House Policy. It is one of the villages represented within the Tsing Yi Rural Committee.

References

External links
 Delineation of area of existing village San Uk Tsuen (Tsing Yi) for election of resident representative (2019 to 2022)

Villages in Kwai Tsing District, Hong Kong
Tsing Yi